Lady S is a Franco-Belgian comics series written by Jean Van Hamme, illustrated by Philippe Aymond and published by Dupuis in French and Cinebook in English.

Story
Lady S. is an agent working for the secretive non-governmental organisation the Centre for Anti-Terrorism Research and Intelligence Gathering (CATRIG). She is also the aide to her adopted father who is a USA diplomat. Previously she had been a refugee and a thief.
CATRIG is an organisation and nobody has clue on that. It has been run by a group of retired intelligence officers of EU.

Adopted daughter and principal collaborator of James Fitzroy, roving ambassador, special correspondent for the American Secretary of State in Europe, Susan is a clever, multilingual young woman, in full bloom and perfectly happy in the eyes of an attentive father.

But this too-perfect happiness hides many faults, sorrows and mysteries. Trapped by her past, Susan will have to play her most dangerous role in a life already rich with adventure: Lady S, high-class spy in a diplomatic environment.

59 Latitude story deals about a planned terror attack on Nobel Prize Ceremony. Suzan Fitzroy is in Sweden, where her adopted father is filling in for the American Ambassador. The most exciting prospect on her agenda is the Nobel Prize ceremony. But her quiet life in Stockholm is disrupted when the mysterious Orion, the secretive anti-terror agent, contacts her: He has another job for her. The "simple task" turns into something much more complex, and before long Suzan is deeply involved in a conspiracy that has links to her past–and to her heart.

Lady S. 05 A Mole in Washington (2008)
What better place to forget the murky world of international spies than... Washington, amid the murky world of politics? Suzan, still her adopted father's assistant, is now working at the White House, where she becomes the unwilling central figure in a nefarious plot to discredit the president of the United States. After bodies start turning up, Suzan's life is turned upside down once again, leaving her no choice but to run. Will she ever be able to stop?

Lady S. 06 Portuguese Salad (2009)

Shania(Lady S), back in Europe after being expelled from the United States, has resumed her work with Orion and his shadowy organisation. Undercover as an interpreter at the European Parliament in Strasbourg, she is tasked with getting close to an extremist suspected of preparing a terrorist attack. The whole mission spirals out of control when she rushes to Portugal, after the CIA contacts her to tell her they've found a man who calls himself Abel Rivkas... her father!.

Lady S. 07 A Second to Eternity (2011)
Another conspiracy set up for her, and this one will cause her dearly.

Volumes
 Na zdorovié, Shaniouchka! - Oct. 2004  
 A ta santé, Suzie! - Sept. 2005  
 59° Latitude Nord - Oct. 2006  
 Jeu de dupes - Oct. 2007  
 Une taupe à Washington - Nov. 2008  
 Salade portugaise - Oct. 2009  
 Une seconde d'éternité - Apr. 2011  
 Raison d'État - Aug. 2012  
 Pour la peau d'une femme - Nov. 2013  
 ADN - Nov. 2014  
 La faille - Nov. 2015
 Rapport de forces - Nov. 2016
 Crimes de guerre - Nov. 2017
 Code Vampiir - Nov. 2019
 Dans la gueule du tigre - Aug. 2021

Translations
Cinebook Ltd is publishing Lady S. The following albums have been released:

 Here's to Suzie (includes "Na zdorovié, Shaniouchka!") - Nov. 2008 
 Latitude 59 Degrees North - March 2010 
 Game of Fools - Oct. 2011 
 A Mole in D.C. - July 2013 
 Portuguese Medley - Nov. 2014 
 A Second of Eternity - 2018

References

External links
 Lady S. English volumes at Cinebook

2004 comics debuts
Action comics
Belgian graphic novels
Belgian comic strips
Comics about women
Drama comics
Dupuis titles
Female characters in comics
Fictional American secret agents
Bandes dessinées
Thriller comics
Spy comics